Acmaeops marginata is a species of the Lepturinae subfamily in the longhorn beetle family. It was described by Johan Christian Fabricius in 1781 and is known from Austria, Belarus, Belgium, Baltic states, Bosnia and Herzegovina, Croatia, Czech Republic, Finland, France, Germany, Greece,  Italy, Norway, Poland, Russia, Serbia, Slovakia, Spain, Sweden, Switzerland, Ukraine, China, Mongolia, and Montenegro. Adult beetle feeds on Scots pine, and Norway spruce.

Description
They fly from May to June during which months they feed on various Pinus species.

Subtaxa
There are three varieties in species:
Acmaeops marginata var. bicoloripes Pic
Acmaeops marginata var. immarginata Plavilstshikov
Acmaeops marginata var. spadicea Pic, 1904

References

Beetles described in 1781
Beetles of Asia
Beetles of Europe
Lepturinae